Attaqa Mountain Pumped Storage Power Plant is an ongoing hydroelectricity power plant currently in development with a planned total capacity of 2400MWp. It is located in Suez, Egypt and is set to be completed in 2024.

Financial  impacts 
The Exim Bank of China agreed to provide $2.6b for the project and the agreement on the interest rate, repayment period of the loan and grace period are being negotiated.

References

External links 
Interactive scholarly application

Hydroelectric power stations in Egypt
Suez